The Islington Railway Workshops are railway workshops in the northern suburbs of Adelaide, South Australia. They were the chief railway workshops of the South Australian Railways, and are still in operation today.

History

The Islington workshops were  established in 1883, 27 years after the South Australian Railways opened its first line. Before that,  workshops were in the Adelaide Railway Station yards adjacent to North Terrace, Adelaide. A major expansion occurred from 1899 to 1902. In the 1920s, the workshops were further expanded and modernised as part of William Webb's revitalisation of the railways. From then on, the workshops constructed large numbers of bogie freight vehicles, passenger cars and designed and built modern "big power" steam locomotives and, later, diesel locomotives and railcars.

During World War II, the workshops were involved in the construction of a number of armoured vehicles for the Australian Imperial Force, most notably the LP1, LP2, LP3 and LP4 series of armoured cars, based on Ford chassis; and the LP1 and LP2 Universal (Bren Gun) carriers.

In 2012, some buildings on the site were given provisional listing as a heritage site. In 2013-2014, parts of the workshops were demolished to make way for the Churchill Shopping Centre that opened in May 2014. The site includes Adelaide's first Coles Superstore. In a further expansion to the shopping centre a further part of the workshops was demolished to make room for an Aldi supermarket and a number of specialty stores.

Adjacent to the workshops is the Jack Watkins Reserve, which was opened on 30 August 2003. It is named after Jack Watkins, union organiser and former president of The Asbestos Diseases Society of South Australia who successfully lobbied to remove asbestos and other toxic contaminants from the railway site and adjacent properties.

Output

The Workshops built many of the locomotives and items of rolling stock that served the South Australian Railways, including:
14 R class steam locomotives
1 Y class steam locomotives
78 T class steam locomotives
2 Z class steam locomotives
12 520 class steam locomotives
10 620 class steam locomotives
10 710 class steam locomotives
17 720 class steam locomotives
2 350 class diesel locomotives
34 500 class diesel locomotives
10 900 class diesel locomotives
12 Brill 55 railcars
38 Brill 75 railcars
18 Bluebird railcars
111 Redhen railcars
9 RL class diesel locomotives

Islington workshops also built 13 Australian Standard Garratt articulated locomotives for the Queensland Railways and Western Australian Government Railways.

Heritage listings
Nine surviving historic portions of the former workshops are listed on the South Australian Heritage Register. They are:

 the Chief Mechanical Engineer's Office
 the Fabrication Shop
 the Workshops Foundry
 the Apprentice School
 the Electrical Shop
 the Fabrication Shop Annex
 a section of the Front Fence
 the Time Office and Correspondence Room
 the Old Bulk Store

References

Locomotive manufacturers of Australia
Railway workshops in Australia
1883 establishments in Australia